This list shows all local and regional political parties in Denmark since the 2007 municipal reform. Local and regional parties in Denmark are commonly knowns as local lists, citizens' lists or common lists (Danish: lokallister, borgerlister and fælleslister). Those parties are not required to follow the same formats for political parties as the ordinary parties. Furthermore, the name of the party does not have to be approved by the Ministry of Social Affairs. Local and regional parties only run for local and regional elections.

Regional parties
Regional parties run only in one of the five regions of Denmark. This list includes only parties that run exclusively in regional elections, and not municipal or general elections.

North Denmark Region

Central Denmark Region

Region of Southern Denmark

Region Zealand

Capital Region of Denmark

Local parties
Local parties are parties that run for local elections in only a single municipality. Occasionally a local party will run in multiple municipalities geographically close to each other. Parties named after a single person with no other candidates are not listed here.

Albertslund Municipality

Allerød Municipality

Assens Municipality

Ballerup Municipality

Billund Municipality

Bornholm Municipality

Brøndby Municipality

Brønderslev Municipality

Copenhagen Municipality

Dragør Municipality

Egedal Municipality

Esbjerg Municipality

Fanø Municipality

Favrskov Municipality

Faxe Municipality

Fredensborg Municipality

Fredericia Municipality

Frederiksberg Municipality

Frederikshavn Municipality

Frederikssund Municipality

Furesø Municipality

Faaborg-Midtfyn Municipality

Gentofte Municipality

Gladsaxe Municipality

Glostrup Municipality

Greve Municipality

Gribskov Municipality

Guldborgsund Municipality

Haderslev Municipality

Halsnæs Municipality

Hedensted Municipality

Helsingør Municipality

Herlev Municipality

Herning Municipality

Hillerød Municipality

Hjørring Municipality

Holbæk Municipality

Holstebro Municipality

Horsens Municipality

Hvidovre Municipality

Høje-Taastrup Municipality

Hørsholm Municipality

Ikast-Brande Municipality

Ishøj Municipality

Jammerbugt Municipality

Kalundborg Municipality

Kerteminde Municipality

Kolding Municipality

Køge Municipality

Langeland Municipality

Lejre Municipality

Lemvig Municipality

Lolland Municipality

Lyngby-Taarbæk Municipality

Læsø Municipality

Mariagerfjord Municipality

Middelfart Municipality

Morsø Municipality

Norddjurs Municipality

Nordfyn Municipality

Nyborg Municipality

Næstved Municipality

Odder Municipality

Odense Municipality

Odsherred Municipality

Randers Municipality

Rebild Municipality

Ringkøbing-Skjern Municipality

Ringsted Municipality

Roskilde Municipality

Rudersdal Municipality

Rødovre Municipality

Samsø Municipality

Silkeborg Municipality

Skanderborg Municipality

Skive Municipality

Slagelse Municipality

Solrød Municipality

Sorø Municipality

Stevns Municipality

Struer Municipality

Svendborg Municipality

Syddjurs Municipality

Sønderborg Municipality

Thisted Municipality

Tønder Municipality

Tårnby Municipality

Vallensbæk Municipality

Varde Municipality

Vejen Municipality

Vejle Municipality

Vesthimmerland Municipality

Viborg Municipality

Vordingborg Municipality

Ærø Municipality

Aabenraa Municipality

Aalborg Municipality

Aarhus Municipality

References

 
Political parties
Political parties